The Winston Churchill School is a comprehensive, secondary school in Woking, England. The school was established in 1967. It is near Knaphill, Bisley, West End, Brookwood and Pirbright. The school holds Specialist Sports College status.

Academics
The Winston Churchill School received a score of "good" (OFSTED April 2018) with GCSE results above the national average. "The curriculum is a strength of the school...teaching is good with aspects that are outstanding...students behaviour both in and out of classrooms is good" and "students feel safe & secure".

Organisation
Teaching occurs during one-hour lessons with Physical Education (P.E.) lessons twice a week (more frequently for P.E. GCSE students). After school clubs provide extra sports and P.E., and other extra-curricular activities.

Planetarium
The Winston Churchill School is the first state school in the UK to have its own permanent planetarium on campus.  It was opened on 10 December 2019 by the fifth incarnation of The Doctor and former Winston Churchill School school student Peter Davison. The planetarium is also open to the public out of school times, showing films on astronomy and holding lectures and space talks.

Radio Woking
Radio Woking is a UK community radio station owned and operated by the school, broadcasting on DAB in the boroughs of Woking and Rushmoor and throughout the world online. Students at the school are trained and get the opportunity to broadcast regularly on the station.

Presenters on the station are volunteers and the station broadcasts a wide range of programmes featuring local guests, sports clubs and specialist music shows.

Notable alumni and faculty
 Major General Jonathan Cole OBE, CIO British Army
 Sam Underwood, TV actor (Dexter, Homeland, The Following)
 Peter Davison, TV actor
 Philip Gould, Baron Gould of Brookwood, architect of New Labour
 Robert Atkinson, footballer
Sarah Mullally, Bishop of London
Deborah James, Journalist
Pamela Motley Verrall, composer

References

External links

Parent teachers association
Radio Woking web site
Planetarium web page

Educational institutions established in 1967
Secondary schools in Surrey
Foundation schools in Surrey